Abdul Hamid bin Pawanteh (27 July 1944 – 1 December 2022) was a Malaysian politician. He was the President of the Malaysian Senate from 2003 to 2009, Deputy Speaker of the Malaysian House of Representatives from 1984 to 1986, and was the Chief Minister of the State of Perlis from 1986 to 1995. He held these offices as a member of the United Malays National Organisation (UMNO), the leading party in Malaysia's ruling Barisan Nasional (BN) coalition.

Abdul Hamid was born on 27 July 1944 in Penang. and received secondary education at Penang Free School. He received his Bachelor of Medicine and Surgery (MBBS) degree in 1973 from Dow Medical College. He was elected to the Malaysian House of Representatives in the 1982 election for the seat of Arau in Perlis.  In 1986, he moved to the Perlis State Assembly and became the State's Menteri Besar.  In 1995, he was replaced as Menteri Besar by fellow UMNO member Shahidan Kassim, and returned to the House of Representatives in 1999 for the seat of Kangar in Perlis. In July 2003, Abdul Hamid stepped down as the Member of Parliament for Kangar to be appointed President of the Senate, where he served as president until 2009.

Abdul Hamid died in Arau on 1 December 2022, at the age of 78.

Honours

Honours of Malaysia
  :
  Commander of the Order of Loyalty to the Crown of Malaysia (PSM) – Tan Sri (1994)
  :
  Knight Grand Commander of the Order of the Crown of Perlis (SPMP) – Dato' Seri (1994)

References

1944 births
2022 deaths
Chief Ministers of Perlis
People from Penang
Malaysian medical doctors
United Malays National Organisation politicians
Malaysian people of Malay descent
Malaysian Muslims
Members of the Dewan Rakyat
Members of the Dewan Negara
Presidents of the Dewan Negara
Members of the Perlis State Legislative Assembly
Perlis state executive councillors
Commanders of the Order of Loyalty to the Crown of Malaysia